The Rt Rev Richard Stanley Heywood (1867–1955) was an Anglican bishop in the first half of the 20th century.

He was born on 27 October 1867, educated at Windlesham House School, Wellington College and Trinity College, Cambridge, and ordained in 1892. After a curacy in  Walcot, Bath, he was Principal of the CMS Divinity School, Poona and then held a similar post in Bombay. In 1918 he became Bishop of Mombasa. He retired to Kenilworth in 1936 and was an Assistant Bishop of Coventry until 1952. He died on  16 December 1955.

Notes

External links

1867 births
People educated at Wellington College, Berkshire
Alumni of Trinity College, Cambridge
English Anglican missionaries
Anglican bishops of Mombasa
20th-century Anglican bishops of the Anglican Church of Kenya
1955 deaths
Anglican missionaries in India
Richard
People educated at Windlesham House School